Hits Out of Hell is a 1984 compilation album by Meat Loaf. It comprises seven Jim Steinman songs. The original release also contained the hit "Modern Girl" from Bad Attitude, which came out at about the same time.

Meat Loaf never liked that he never had any say in these compilations and numerous others soon followed in Hits out of Hells footsteps. The Australian edition of the album is the only CD release of the song "Lost Love", which was originally the b-side to "If You Really Want To" from the album Midnight at the Lost and Found. The album was rereleased and expanded in 2009 by Epic Records, adding the tracks "I'd Do Anything for Love (But I Won't Do That)" (from Bat Out of Hell II: Back into Hell) and "I'd Lie for You (And That's the Truth)" (from Welcome to the Neighbourhood). "Lost Love" was not included.

Track listing
 Original release 
"Bat Out of Hell" (Jim Steinman) - 9:48
"Read 'Em and Weep" (Steinman) - 5:25
"Midnight at the Lost and Found" (Meat Loaf/Steve Buslowe/Paul Christie/Dan Peyronel) - 3:31
"Two Out of Three Ain't Bad" (Steinman) - 5:23
"Dead Ringer for Love" (Steinman) - 4:21
"Modern Girl" (Paul Jacobs/Sarah Durkee) – 4:24
"I'm Gonna Love Her for Both of Us" (Steinman) - 7:09
"You Took the Words Right Out of My Mouth (Hot Summer Night)" (Steinman) – 5:04
"Razor's Edge" (Meat Loaf/Buslowe/Christie/Mark Doyle)- 4:07
"Paradise by the Dashboard Light" (Steinman) – 8:28
I. "Paradise"
II. "Let Me Sleep on It"
III. "Praying for the End of Time"
"Lost Love" (Buslowe/Meat Loaf) - 3:37  *(Australian release only)

Current release
"Bat Out of Hell" (Jim Steinman) - 9:48
"Read 'Em and Weep" (Steinman) - 5:25
"Midnight at the Lost and Found" (Meat Loaf/Steve Buslowe/Paul Christie/Dan Peyronel) - 3:31
"Two Out of Three Ain't Bad" (Steinman) - 5:23
"Dead Ringer for Love" (Steinman) - 4:21
"All Revved Up with No Place to Go" (Steinman) – 4:20
"I'm Gonna Love Her for Both of Us" (Steinman) - 7:09
"You Took the Words Right Out of My Mouth (Hot Summer Night)" (Steinman) – 5:04
"Razor's Edge" (Meat Loaf/Buslowe/Christie/Mark Doyle)- 4:07
"Paradise by the Dashboard Light" (Steinman) – 8:28

2009 Epic Records expanded edition
"Bat Out of Hell" (Jim Steinman) - 9:48
"Read 'Em and Weep" (Steinman) - 5:23
"Midnight at the Lost and Found" (Meat Loaf/Steve Buslowe/Paul Christie/Dan Peyronel) - 3:30
"Two Out of Three Ain't Bad" (Steinman) - 5:22
"Dead Ringer for Love" (Steinman) - 4:22
"Modern Girl" (Paul Jacobs/Sarah Durkee) - 4:22
"I'm Gonna Love Her for Both of Us" (Steinman) - 7:07
"You Took the Words Right Out of My Mouth (Hot Summer Night)" (Steinman) – 4:11
"Razor's Edge" (Meat Loaf/Buslowe/Christie/Mark Doyle)- 4:07
"Paradise by the Dashboard Light" (Steinman) – 8:29
"I'd Do Anything for Love (But I Won't Do That)" (Steinman) - 5:25
"I'd Lie for You (And That's the Truth)" (Diane Warren) - 6:30

Charts
Weekly charts

Year-end charts

Certifications

Video releaseHits Out of Hell''' had a collection of Meat Loaf's music Videos of the late 1970s and 1980s, which came out simultaneously with the album release.

Tracks
"Bat Out of Hell"
"Read 'Em and Weep"
"Two Out of Three Ain't Bad"
"Razor's Edge"
"More than You Deserve"
"I'm Gonna Love Her for Both of Us"
"If You Really Want To"
"You Took the Words Right Out of My Mouth (Hot Summer Night)"
"Paradise by the Dashboard Light"

Missing video
A VHS version of Hits Out of Hell was later released in the United Kingdom and included the music video for "Dead Ringer for Love". This was only edited into the United States version when it was released with Bat Out of Hell as a special edition.

Reedits
In the original video for "Paradise by the Dashboard Light" as released to television and in 35mm prints, the male/female "Hot Summer Night" prologue from "You Took the Words Right Out of My Mouth" was spoken live by Jim Steinman and Karla DeVito before the song performance. On this compilation, the prologue was removed and spliced in front of the video for "You Took the Words Right Out of My Mouth", ostensibly to properly replicate the album Bat Out of Hell'', and the video for "Paradise by the Dashboard Light" goes right into the performance.

Certifications

References

Meat Loaf albums
Meat Loaf video albums
1984 compilation albums
1984 video albums
Music video compilation albums